Dharmesh Prasad Varma is an Indian politician from Bihar who represented Bettiah in the Lok Sabha from 1989 to 1991. He previously served as member of Bihar Legislative Assembly from Sikta on Janata Party ticket from 1980 to 1989. He contested 2014 Indian general election on AAP ticket from Valmiki Nagar only to lose to Satish Chandra Dubey of the BJP. He contested 2015 Bihar election from Sikta on Samajwadi Party ticket but lost to Firoj Ahmad of the JDU.

References 

India MPs 1989–1991
1944 births
Lok Sabha members from Bihar
People from Bettiah
Bihar MLAs 1980–1985
Bihar MLAs 1985–1990
Living people